Sand Lake is a lake in Patterson Township in the Almaguin Highlands of Parry Sound District, Ontario, Canada.

See also
List of lakes in Ontario

References
 National Resources Canada

Lakes of Parry Sound District